Černá hora (i.e. Black Mountain) is a  mountain in the Bohemian Forest, near the border with Bavaria, Germany. Its summit is entirely covered in dense spruce forest. At the foot of the mountain there is the source of the longest Czech river, the Vltava.

The northern and eastern slopes of the mountain lie in the municipal territory of Kvilda, the western slopes lie in the territory of Modrava.

References

Mountains and hills of the Czech Republic
Prachatice District
Bohemian Forest